Arta Rama (born 19 April 1995) is an Albanian–Kosovan footballer who plays as a forward. She was a member of the Albania women's national team before Kosovo being accepted as a member of UEFA and FIFA. After that, she has played for Kosovo.

See also
List of Albania women's international footballers
List of Kosovo women's international footballers

References

1995 births
Living people
Albanian women's footballers
Kosovan women's footballers
Women's association football forwards
KFF Hajvalia players
Albania women's international footballers
Kosovo women's international footballers
Dual internationalists (women's football)